Inside Higher Ed is a media company and online publication that provides news, opinion, resources, events and jobs focused on college and university topics. In 2022, Quad Partners, a private equity firm, sold Inside Higher Education to Times Higher Education and Inflexion Private Equity. The company is based in Washington, D.C., United States.

History
Inside Higher Education was founded in 2004 by Scott Jaschik and Doug Lederman, two former editors of  The Chronicle of Higher Education, as well as Kathlene Collins, formerly a business manager for The Chronicle.

In 2015, Quad Partners acquired a controlling interest in the publication. Quad Partners had also owned at least five for-profit colleges: Blue Cliff College, Pacific College of Oriental Medicine, Swedish Institute, Trillium College, and Dorsey Schools. Quad Partners also invested in for-profit child development centers, preschools, and student information systems.

As of 2022, Inside Higher Ed’s chief executive officer is Dari Gessner.

Content
Inside Higher Ed publishes daily and content includes news stories, opinion essays and career advice. The publication also hosts several blogs on education topics, including "Confessions of a Community College Dean," "Conditionally Accepted" and "GradHacker." It also publishes Admissions Matters, an online publication about college admissions and enrollment news. In 2018, Inside Higher Ed began publishing supplemental reports in addition to its regular news and editorial offerings. Inside Higher Ed publishes a weekly podcast, "The Key with Inside Higher Ed," in which editors and reporters discuss the challenges posed to higher education by the pandemic and recession, with a particular focus on lower-income students.<ref>Inside Higher Ed Podcast, North American Interfraternity Conference</ref>

Since 2012, Inside Higher Ed and Gallup have partnered to annually survey higher education professionals. In addition, Inside Higher Ed publishes the American Association of University Professors' (AAUP) Faculty Compensation Survey data.Inside Higher Ed's content regularly appears in other publications such as Slate and Business Insider. Inside Higher Ed'' has been recognized by The Association for the Study of Higher Education and NASPA: Student Affairs Administrators in Higher Education.

References

External links 
 

Online magazines published in the United States
Higher education in the United States
Works about academia
Magazines established in 2004
Education magazines
Magazines published in Washington, D.C.